The Insurance Company of Prince Edward Island, was established by Charlie Cooke in 1987 in Prince Edward Island. In 2001 SGI purchased a 75% share of the insurance company at a cost of $2.7 Million Canadian from CGU Group with the remaining shares being owned by the Cooke family. The company provides a full line of automobile, home and commercial insurance in the Canada provinces of Prince Edward Island, New Brunswick, and Nova Scotia.

References

Companies based in Charlottetown
Insurance companies of Canada
Financial services companies established in 1987
1987 establishments in Prince Edward Island